The 1993–94 George Washington Colonials men's basketball team represent George Washington University as a member of the Atlantic 10 Conference during the 1993–94 NCAA Division I men's basketball season. The team was coached by Mike Jarvis and played their home games at the Charles E. Smith Athletic Center. The Colonials finished in a three-way tie for third place in the regular season conference standings. After being knocked out in the semifinal round of the A-10 tournament, GW received an at-large bid to the 1994 NCAA tournament as No. 10 seed in the East region. The Colonials defeated No. 7 seed UAB before falling to No. 2 seed UConn, 75–63, to finish with a record of 18–12 (8–8 A-10).

Roster

Schedule and results

|-
!colspan=9 style=| Regular season

|-
!colspan=9 style=| Atlantic 10 Tournament

|-
!colspan=9 style=| NCAA Tournament

Rankings

References

George Washington
George Washington Colonials men's basketball seasons
George Washington